In mathematics, a measurable space or Borel space is a basic object in measure theory. It consists of a set and a σ-algebra, which defines the subsets that will be measured.

Definition

Consider a set  and a σ-algebra  on  Then the tuple  is called a measurable space.

Note that in contrast to a measure space, no measure is needed for a measurable space.

Example

Look at the set:

One possible -algebra would be:

Then  is a measurable space. Another possible -algebra would be the power set on :

With this, a second measurable space on the set  is given by

Common measurable spaces

If  is finite or countably infinite, the -algebra is most often the power set on  so  This leads to the measurable space 

If  is a topological space, the -algebra is most commonly the Borel -algebra  so  This leads to the measurable space  that is common for all topological spaces such as the real numbers

Ambiguity with Borel spaces

The term Borel space is used for different types of measurable spaces. It can refer to
 any measurable space, so it is a synonym for a measurable space as defined above 
 a measurable space that is Borel isomorphic to a measurable subset of the real numbers (again with the Borel -algebra)

See also

References

Measure theory
Space (mathematics)